HSwMS Hälsingland (Hgd), was the second submarine of the . The vessel was named after Hälsingland, Sweden. The submarine was launched on 31 August 1987 and entered service with the Swedish Navy on 20 October 1988. Hälsingland served with the Swedish Navy until 1997 when the submarine was decommissioned. In 2005 Hälsingland and sister boat  were sold to Singapore where Hälsingland was renamed RSS Archer and entered service on 2 December 2011. Archer remains in service.

Development 
The submarine design combined the best properties from the preceding Swedish  and es. Submarines of the Västergötland class had greater submarine hunting capacity than previous classes, partly due to the fact that they were equipped with a new modern submarine torpedo. The submarines in the Västergötland class were able to fire up to six heavy and six light wire-guided torpedoes at the same time against different targets, a world record of perhaps dubious benefit that probably still stands today.

After significant upgrades, these two submarines were reclassified to a new .

Service in Sweden 

Service in Singapore 
HSwMS Hälsingland was renamed RSS Archer. Singapore's Ministry of Defence (MINDEF) signed an agreement with Kockums for the supply of two  (formerly Västergötland-class) submarines to the Republic of Singapore Navy (RSN) on 4 November 2005. More than 20 years old and previously in reserve with the Swedish Navy, the submarines were transferred to the RSN on completion of the modernisation and conversion for operation in tropical waters. RSS Archer was launched on 16 June 2009. RSS Archer has undergone sea trials following its launch and is now operational. The second submarine, RSS Swordsman, was launched on 20 October 2010. The Archer-class submarines entered service in 2013 and replaced the s that were retired in 2015. RSS Archer's crew motto and philosophy is 'Strike Silent, Strike as One'.

RSS Archer's inaugural exercise was in 2013 as part of Exercise CARAT with the United States Navy. It has since taken part in numerous exercises such as Ex Singsiam and Ex SIMBEX which is held with the Royal Thai Navy and Indian Navy respectively.  

In 2014, RSS Archer was awarded the Republic of Singapore Navy's Best Ship Award, after participating in fleet-level exercises with various foreign partners including the United States Navy. 

In 2015, RSS Archer participated in the first-ever anti-submarine warfare exercise in Exercise Singsiam's history in the Andaman Sea alongside counterparts from the Royal Thai Navy. During the exercise, RSS Archer trained with naval helicopters jointly deployed from HTMS Naresuan, HTMS Saiburi, RSS Intrepid as well as a Dornier 228 Marine Patrol Aircraft(MPA). 

On July 2015, RSS Archer participated in the 21st Exercise CARAT after 11 days of intensive shore and at sea exercises. This exercise is noted to have involved a Los Angeles Class submarine, USS Houston, the Arleigh Burke class USS Lassen and a P-8A Poseidon maritime patrol aircraft as well as the Republic of Singapore Navy warships RSS Supreme for the Anti-Submarine Warfare training engagement.

Gallery

References 

Västergötland-class submarines
Ships built in Malmö
1987 ships
Archer-class submarines
Republic of Singapore Navy